Stig Kristiansen (born 12 August 1970) is a Norwegian former cyclist. He competed in the team time trial at the 1992 Summer Olympics.

References

External links
 

1970 births
Living people
Norwegian male cyclists
Olympic cyclists of Norway
Cyclists at the 1992 Summer Olympics
Cyclists from Oslo